The Roussel R-30 was a French light fighter-bomber prototype of the 1930s.

Design and development
Only one prototype, similar to the Bloch MB.150 but reduced in size and weight, was constructed in 1938 armed with two  Hispano-Suiza HS.404 cannons. Whilst being re-engined with an  power plant, the German invasion reached Paris. The airframe was transported to Bordeaux, where the sole R-30 was destroyed when the building it was being stored in was destroyed in a blaze.

Specifications

References

Notes

Bibliography

William Green, Gordon Swanborough, The Great Book of Fighters, Motorbooks International 10/2006, .

World War II French fighter aircraft
1930s French fighter aircraft